John Røen (22 April 1903 – 18 March 1979) was a Norwegian cross-country skier from Møre og Romsdal. He competed in the 50 km at the 1928 Winter Olympics in St. Moritz.

Cross-country skiing results

Olympic Games

References

1903 births
1979 deaths
Sportspeople from Møre og Romsdal
Norwegian male cross-country skiers
Olympic cross-country skiers of Norway
Cross-country skiers at the 1928 Winter Olympics